The 1990–91 Hartford Whalers season was the franchise's 19th season, 12th in the NHL. The Whalers placed fourth in the Adams Division to qualify for the playoffs. The Whalers were eliminated in the first round by their New England rival Boston Bruins.

Offseason
At the 1990 NHL Supplemental Draft held on June 15, the Whalers selected Jim Crozier with the 19th selection. Crozier played the 1989-90 season with Cornell University. In 16 games with the Big Red, Crozier posted a 10-3-1 record with a 2.63 GAA.

On June 16, 1990, the Whalers participated at the 1990 NHL Entry Draft held at BC Place in Vancouver, British Columbia. With the 15th overall selection, the club selected Mark Greig from the Lethbridge Hurricanes of the Western Hockey League. In 65 games with the Hurricanes, Greig scored 55 goals and 135 points in 1989-90. In the second round of the draft, Hartford selected Geoff Sanderson from the Swift Current Broncos of the WHL with the 36th overall selection. Sanderson scored 32 goals and 94 points in 70 games with the Broncos during the 1989-90 season. Some other notable players selected by Hartford include Mike Lenarduzzi, Jergus Baca, and Espen Knutsen.

The Whalers and New York Rangers made a trade on July 7, as Hartford acquired Carey Wilson and a third round selection in the 1991 NHL Entry Draft in exchange for Jody Hull. In 41 games with the Rangers during the 1989-90 season, Wilson scored nine goals and 26 points. Wilson had previously played with the Whalers from 1987–89, where in 70 games, he scored 29 goals and 60 points.

On July 16, the Whalers signed free agent John Stevens to a contract. Stevens spent the 1989-90 season with the Hershey Bears of the American Hockey League, where he scored three goals, 13 points, and accumulated 193 penalty minutes in 79 games. Stevens had previous NHL experience, as he appeared in nine games with the Philadelphia Flyers from 1986-88.

On September 30, the club signed free agent Paul Cyr from the New York Rangers. Cyr missed the entire 1989-90 due to injuries, and played in only one game during the 1988-89 season. In his last healthy season in 1987-88, split between the Buffalo Sabres and the Rangers, Cyr scored five goals and 19 points in 60 games. Also on this day, the Whalers acquired a sixth round draft pick at the 1992 NHL Entry Draft from the Washington Capitals in exchange for Dave Tippett.

Four days later, on October 3, the Whalers made a second trade with the Washington Capitals, as Hartford acquired cash considerations from Washington in exchange for Joel Quenneville.

Regular season

The Whalers had the most power-play opportunities during the regular season, with 403.

Final standings

Schedule and results

Playoffs
Adams Division Semi-finals

Player statistics

Regular season
Scoring

Goaltending

Playoffs
Scoring

Goaltending

Note: GP = Games played; G = Goals; A = Assists; Pts = Points; +/- = Plus-minus PIM = Penalty minutes; PPG = Power-play goals; SHG = Short-handed goals; GWG = Game-winning goals;
      MIN = Minutes played; W = Wins; L = Losses; T = Ties; GA = Goals against; GAA = Goals-against average;  SO = Shutouts; SA=Shots against; SV=Shots saved; SV% = Save percentage;

Awards and records

Transactions
The Whalers were involved in the following transactions during the 1990–91 season.

Trades

Free agents

Draft picks
Hartford's draft picks at the 1990 NHL Entry Draft held at the BC Place in Vancouver, British Columbia.

Farm teams

See also
1990–91 NHL season

References

External links

1990–91 NHL season by team
1990–91 in American ice hockey by team
1990-91
Hart
Hart